NXT TakeOver: Unstoppable was the fifth NXT TakeOver professional wrestling livestreaming event produced by WWE. It was held exclusively for wrestlers from the promotion's developmental territory, NXT. The event aired exclusively on the WWE Network and took place on May 20, 2015, at NXT's home arena, Full Sail University in Winter Park, Florida.

The event featured six matches as part of the televised broadcast and one that was a dark match that occurred prior to the televised portion of the show. The main event saw Kevin Owens defending the NXT Championship against Sami Zayn. The event is notable for the surprise WWE debut of Samoa Joe. The event included five additional matches, including matches for the NXT Women's Championship and the NXT Tag Team Championship.

Production

Background
TakeOver was a series of professional wrestling shows that began in May 2014, as WWE's then-developmental league NXT held their second WWE Network-exclusive event, billed as TakeOver. In subsequent months, the "TakeOver" moniker became the brand used by WWE for all of their NXT live specials. Unstoppable was scheduled as the fifth NXT TakeOver event and took place on May 20, 2015, at NXT's home arena, Full Sail University in Winter Park, Florida.

Storylines

The card comprised six matches, as well as one dark match before the broadcast. The matches resulted from scripted storylines, where wrestlers portrayed heroes, villains, or less distinguishable characters that built tension and culminated in a wrestling match or series of matches. Results were predetermined by WWE's writers on the NXT brand, while storylines were produced on their weekly television program, NXT.

Event

Preliminary matches 
The event opened with Finn Bálor facing Tyler Breeze to determine who would be the number one contender for the NXT Championship. The match originally also included Hideo Itami, but Itami suffered a shoulder injury and was not able to compete. To explain Itami's absence, WWE aired footage of a (kayfabe) attack on Itami in the parking lot. While never explicitly stated, the footage revealed that Kevin Owens was near by during the attack. During the match, Breeze performed a "Supermodel Kick" on Bálor for a near-fall. After Bálor collided with an exposed turnbuckle, Breeze executed a "Beauty Shot" for a near-fall. In the end, Bálor executed a running front dropkick on Breeze, knocking him into the turnbuckles, and a "Coup de Grâce" to win the match.

Next, Emma and Dana Brooke faced Bayley and Charlotte. In the end, Bayley performed a "Bayley-to-Belly Suplex" on Dana. Charlotte executed "Natural Selection" on Emma to win the match.

After that, Baron Corbin faced Rhyno. Corbin executed "End of Days" on Rhyno to win the match.

In the fourth match, Blake and Murphy defended their NXT Tag Team Championship against Enzo Amore and Colin Cassady (accompanied by their valet, Carmella). In the end, Alexa Bliss attacked Carmella. As Cass checked on his valet, Murphy attacked him with a superkick. Bliss shook the ring ropes, knocking Amore off the top rope. Blake pinned Enzo to retain the titles.

In the penultimate match, Sasha Banks defended the NXT Women's Championship against Becky Lynch. During the match, Lynch applied the "Dis-arm-her" on Banks but Banks touched the rope, forcing Lynch to release the hold. In the end, Banks forced Lynch to submit to the "Bank Statement" to retain the title.

Main event 
In the main event, Kevin Owens defended the NXT Championship against Sami Zayn. Zayn performed a "Blue Thunder Bomb" on Owens for a near-fall. Zayn executed an exploder suplex into the turnbuckles on 
Owens and attempted a "Helluva Kick", but Owens rolled out of the ring. Zayn performed an exploder suplex on the floor on Owens. Owens performed a pop-up powerbomb onto the ring apron on Zayn. As Zayn appeared to have injured his shoulder and was unable to compete, the match came to a halt but Owens continued to attack his injured opponent, drawing out NXT General Manager William Regal. Regal raked Owens's face but Owens retaliated with a headbutt. Samoa Joe appeared, making his surprise debut, to stop Owens's attack. After staring at Joe, Owens grabbed the title belt and then walked away as medics tended to Zayn at ringside.

Aftermath
The main event match was the last match for Sami Zayn before having to undergo shoulder surgery to deal with an injury he suffered in the weeks prior to TakeOver. He would not return until December. With his victory Finn Bálor earned a match against champion Kevin Owens in one of the main matches of The Beast in the East, a WWE Network special on July 4, 2015. Bálor defeated Owens to become the seventh NXT Champion. He later successfully defended the championship against Owens at NXT TakeOver: Brooklyn and went on to hold the title for 292 days, becoming the second longest-reigning NXT champion.

After her successful defense of the NXT Women's Championship Sasha Banks made her Raw debut on July 13, while still the NXT Women's Champion. In NXT Bayley returned from a hand injury and stated that she wanted a title match against Sasha Banks. Bayley then challenged and defeated Charlotte on the August 5 episode of NXT. On the August 12 episode of NXT, Bayley defeated Becky Lynch to earn the title match at NXT TakeOver: Brooklyn. On August 22, Bayley defeated Banks to win the NXT Women's Championship.

Results

Footnotes

References 

Unstoppable
2015 WWE Network events
Events in Florida
2015 in professional wrestling in Florida
Professional wrestling in Winter Park, Florida
May 2015 events in the United States